Dean Emmett Delaurier is a Canadian former ice sledge hockey player (goal tender). He won a silver medal with Team Canada at the 1998 Winter Paralympics.

References

Living people
Paralympic sledge hockey players of Canada
Canadian sledge hockey players
Paralympic silver medalists for Canada
1954 births
Medalists at the 1998 Winter Paralympics
Paralympic medalists in sledge hockey
Ice sledge hockey players at the 1998 Winter Paralympics